Dale Eugene Godboldo, Jr. (born July 5, 1975) is an American television and film actor.

Early life
Godboldo was born in Dallas, Texas.

Career
He started his career on Disney's All New Mickey Mouse Club and appeared in guest roles on Moesha and had a recurring role on the short-lived UPN series Goode Behavior.

He made his film debut in the 1999 film Dirt Merchant, followed by roles in ER and Promised Land. In 1999, he co-starred in another short-lived UPN series Shasta McNasty. After the series was canceled in 2000, Goldboldo had a role on the NBC series Kristin, starring Kristin Chenoweth. In 2003, he portrayed Keith Townsend on the Fox sitcom Wanda at Large. Since its cancellation in 2003, he has guest starred on Courting Alex, Commander in Chief, and Women's Murder Club. Godboldo played Cooper in the short-lived show Jenny that starred Jenny MaCarthy and George Hamilton. In 2008, he had a role in the thriller Lakeview Terrace, starring Samuel L. Jackson. He starred as lawyer Carl E. Douglas in The People v. O. J. Simpson: American Crime Story.

Philanthropy

Godboldo has fundraised for a wide range of efforts including education and arts training, gender equality, early childhood development, the eradication of poverty, ending human trafficking, feeding the homeless, promoting good health and well-being, economic empowerment through entrepreneurship training, and the facilitation of live organ transplants to save lives. Beneficiaries have included THORN, Feed A Billion, INROADS, Clinton Foundation, Just Keep Livin Foundation, Quincy Jones Foundation, Charlize Theron Africa Outreach Project, Breed Life, Child Liberation Foundation, My Life My Power, Firelife Foundation, and The Jenesse Project, among many others.

Honorees and special guests of Godboldo's events have included President Bill Clinton, President George W. Bush, Robert De Niro, James Cameron, Matthew McConaughey, Diddy, Richard Branson, John Travolta, Quincy Jones, Martin Scorsese, Eva Longoria, Selena Gomez, Demi Lovato, Sean Penn, Jada Pinkett Smith, Charlize Theron, and Halle Berry, among others.

Godboldo currently executive produces Unite4: Humanity as President of ARG Media, and operates his businesses under the brand, Dale Godboldo Enterprises.

Godboldo formed the Always In The Club Foundation in appreciation of the training and mentorship he received as a young man on the Mickey Mouse Club.

Godboldo recently executive produced #MMC30 – The ‘All-New’ Mickey Mouse Club Cast Reunion & 30th Anniversary Celebration at Walt Disney Resort benefitting Always In The Club, and Central Florida's onePULSE Foundation and Give Kids The World Village.

With help from President Bill Clinton, Godboldo launched Project:NOW – a non-profit initiative that rapidly addresses the educational needs of at-risk youth in America. Its first fundraiser was held in New York with George W. Bush on September 24, 2014. The evening was sponsored by Amway and Unite4:Good, and hosted by The Good Wife's Chris Noth.

Filmography

References

External links
 

1975 births
Male actors from Texas
American male child actors
American male film actors
American male television actors
Living people
Mouseketeers
People from Dallas
21st-century American singers